The 2022–23 North Carolina A&T Aggies men's basketball team represented North Carolina A&T State University in the 2022–23 NCAA Division I men's basketball season. The Aggies, led by interim head coach Phillip Shumpert, played their home games at the Corbett Sports Center in Greensboro, North Carolina as first-year members of the Colonial Athletic Association.

Previous season
The Aggies finished the 2021–22 season 12–20, 6–10 in Big South play to finish in fifth place in the North Division. In the Big South tournament, they defeated Radford in the first round, before falling to top-seeded Longwood in the quarterfinals. This would be the team's only season as a member of the Big South Conference, as they moved to the Colonial Athletic Association, effective July 1, 2022. On August 18, the school announced the firing of head coach Willie Jones, after only two years at the helm. Assistant coach Phillip Shumpert will be the interim head coach for the 2022–23 season, as the school will look for a new head coach following the end of the season.

Roster

Schedule and results

|-
!colspan=12 style=| Non-conference regular season

|-
!colspan=12 style=| CAA regular season

|-
!colspan=12 style=|CAA tournament

Sources

References

North Carolina A&T Aggies men's basketball seasons
North Carolina A&T Aggies
North Carolina A&T Aggies men's basketball
North Carolina A&T Aggies men's basketball